Mixer may refer to:

Electronics
 DJ mixer, a type of audio mixing console used by disc jockeys
 Electronic mixer, electrical circuit for adding signal voltages
 Frequency mixer, electrical circuit that creates new frequencies from two signals applied to it
 Mixing console, an electronic device for combining sounds of different audio signals
 Mix engineer, person who combines elements of recorded music into a final version
 Mode scrambler, known as a mode mixer, telecommunications device for inducing mode coupling in an optical fiber
 Sound card mixer, analog part of a sound card that routes and mixes sound signals
 Vision mixer, an electronic device for combining video signals

Industrial and lab equipment
 Concrete mixer, a machine which combines the ingredients of concrete, a.k.a. cement mixer
 Feed mixer, for mixing feed ingredients
 High-shear mixer, a device that disperse, or transports one phase or ingredient (liquid, solid, gas) into a main continuous phase (liquid)
 High viscosity mixer
 Impinging mixer, part of a reaction injection molding system
 Industrial mixer, a machine for mixing the materials in industrial scale
 Static mixer, a device for mixing two fluid materials through a tube containing a series of baffles
 Submersible mixer, a machine used for mixing liquids and slurries in tanks (e.g. wastewater, liquid manure, etc.)
 Vortex mixer, a laboratory device

Entertainment
 Mixer (service), a defunct interactive video game streaming platform by Microsoft
 Mixer dance, a kind of participation dance that involves changing partners
 Production sound mixer, the head of a film production sound crew
 Mixer (album), a 2012 album by Desario
 "The Mixer", a 1991 song by The Fall from Shift-Work
 The Mixer, a 1992 TV series, starring Simon Williams

Other
 Mixer (appliance), kitchen appliance used to combine ingredients
 Mixer (engine), a device for quieting an airplane engine
 Drink mixer, non-alcoholic ingredients in mixed drinks and cocktails
 Mixer, an alternate name for a singles event

See also
 Mix (disambiguation)